1506 Xosa, provisional designation , is a stony asteroid and slow rotator from the middle region of the asteroid belt, approximately 13 kilometers in diameter. It was discovered on 15 May 1939, by English-born, South African astronomer Cyril Jackson at the Johannesburg Observatory in South Africa. It is named for the Xhosa people.

Orbit and classification 

The S-type asteroid orbits the Sun at a distance of 1.9–3.2 AU once every 4 years and 2 months (1,507 days). Its orbit has an eccentricity of 0.26 and an inclination of 13° with respect to the ecliptic. Xosas observation arc begins with its official discovery observation, as no precoveries were taken and no prior identifications were made.

Physical characteristics

Slow rotator 

In Fall 2010, lightcurve photometry by Brian Warner and at the Palomar Transient Factory revealed that Xosa is a slow rotator with a notably long rotation period of 292 and 298 hours and a brightness variation of 0.70 and 0.42 magnitude, respectively. It also seems to be in a non-principal axis rotation (NPAR), colloquially called as "tumbling". However, observations are insufficient to determine the body's tumbling, or to rule out a non-tumbling state (T0). These observations superseded previous periods obtained in 2001 and 2005.

Diameter and albedo 

According to the survey carried out by NASA's Wide-field Infrared Survey Explorer with its subsequent NEOWISE mission, Xosa measures 13.96 kilometers in diameter and its surface has an albedo of 0.157, while the Collaborative Asteroid Lightcurve Link assumes a standard albedo for stony asteroids of 0.20 and calculates a diameter of 11.83 kilometers using an absolute magnitude of 12.0.

Naming 

This minor planet was named after the Xhosa (formerly spelled "Xosa"), a Bantu ethnic group of native people in south-east South Africa, and who came into early contact with the white settlers. The official  was published by the Minor Planet Center in April 1953.

References

External links 
 Lightcurve plot of 1506 Xosa, Palmer Divide Observatory, B. D. Warner (2001)
 Asteroid Lightcurve Database (LCDB), query form (info )
 Dictionary of Minor Planet Names, Google books
 Asteroids and comets rotation curves, CdR – Observatoire de Genève, Raoul Behrend
 Discovery Circumstances: Numbered Minor Planets (1)-(5000) – Minor Planet Center
 
 

001506
Discoveries by Cyril Jackson (astronomer)
Named minor planets
001506
19390515